Sir Richard Buller (1578–1642) was an English politician who sat in the House of Commons variously between 1621 and 1642. He was a Parliamentarian officer during the English Civil War.

Buller was born at Shillingham Cornwall, the son of Francis Buller and his wife Thomasina Williams, daughter of Thomas Williams of Stowford, an Elizabethan-era Speaker of the House of Commons. He was knighted in 1608.

Buller was elected Member of Parliament for St Germans in 1621. He was subsequently MP for Saltash from 1625 to 1629 when King Charles I decided to rule without parliament. He was High Sheriff of Cornwall in 1637. In April 1640, Buller was elected MP for Cornwall in the Short Parliament. In November 1640, he was elected MP for Fowey in the Long Parliament. 
 
Buller was involved in military operations in Cornwall in 1642, and was forced to retreat from Launceston. He died in November that year at the age of 64.

Marriage and issue
Buller married Alice Hayward, the daughter of Sir Rowland Hayward, Lord Mayor of London. They had six sons and six daughters. Three  of their sons, Francis, George, and Anthony, served in Parliament.

References

 
 

1578 births
1642 deaths
Members of the pre-1707 English Parliament for constituencies in Cornwall
People from Saltash
16th-century English people
Roundheads
High Sheriffs of Cornwall
English MPs 1621–1622
English MPs 1625
English MPs 1626
English MPs 1628–1629
English MPs 1640 (April)
Richard